New Bussa is a town in Niger State, Nigeria. It is the new site of Bussa after the Kainji Lake dam set the previous location underwater.  As of 2007 New Bussa had an estimated population of 24,449.
New Bussa is the headquarters of the Borgu Emirate and the Borgu Local Government Area.

Geography

References

External links

Populated places in Niger State